Line 1 of the Nantong Rail Transit is a rapid transit line in Nantong, Jiangsu, China. It runs from Pingchao station to Zhenxing Lu station.

History
Construction began on December 18, 2017. The line opened on November 10, 2022.

Stations

References

Nantong Rail Transit lines
Underground rapid transit in China
Railway lines opened in 2022